Robert Moss (13 February 1952 – 1 August 2010) born in Chigwell, Essex, was an English professional footballer who played in the Football League, as a forward.

1952 births
2010 deaths
People from Chigwell
English footballers
Association football forwards
Leyton Orient F.C. players
Colchester United F.C. players
Folkestone F.C. players
Dover F.C. players
Wimbledon F.C. players
Barnet F.C. players
Wealdstone F.C. players
Chelmsford City F.C. players
English Football League players